Trap Gunner: Countdown to Oblivion, or just , known in Europe as Trap Runner, is a PlayStation video game published by Atlus in 1998, and by Konami in 1999. It is a strategy, arcade-style game for one or two players.

Gameplay
The purpose of the game to run around various levels and to set traps, which are invisible to your opponent. Players can shoot at one another while setting traps. Each character has a different melee weapon with unique attributes.

The story mode unveils each character's background and relation to the other characters.

Traps
Switch detonator An explosive device activated by pressing the X button, it is usually used in tandem with other traps
Mine A land mine that explodes when stepped on
Bomb Useless on its own, the bomb is very powerful in combination with the remote detonator or mine
Pitfall The pitfall halts an opponent's movement by trapping them in a pit for a few seconds, making them vulnerable to attacks
Force panel The force panel forces your foe in a preset direction; multiple force panels can be used to guide opponents into a mine or trap combination.
Gas Gas has the largest effect radius of all standalone traps and detonates via timer. Once the gas is set, it is only a matter of time before nerve agent permeates the area, damaging all players with constant health loss, which remains with the player for a few seconds once they escape the vapor cloud.

Characters
Van Raily
John Bishous
Tenrou Ugetsu
Tico
Lou Riche
Abdol Rerin

Secret Characters
Rem
Dyn
Erg

Reception

The game received above-average reviews according to the review aggregation website GameRankings. GamePro said, "Those who are searching for a good mix of real-time strategy and fighting will find that Trap Gunner fits the bill." Next Generation called it "one of the season's sleeper hits." In Japan, Famitsu gave it a score of 29 out of 40.

Notes

References

External links

1998 video games
Action video games
Atlus games
Cancelled Game Boy Color games
Konami games
PlayStation (console) games
PlayStation (console)-only games
Puzzle video games
Racjin games
Strategy video games
Video games developed in Japan